Taiwanese Journal of Mathematics is a peer-reviewed mathematics journal published by Mathematical Society of the Republic of China (Taiwan).
Established in 1973 as the Chinese Journal of Mathematics, the journal was renamed to its current name in 1997. It is indexed by Mathematical Reviews and Zentralblatt MATH.
Its 2017 impact factor was 0.718.

External links

Mathematics journals
Publications established in 1973
English-language journals
Bimonthly journals